HMS LST-407 was a United States Navy  that was transferred to the Royal Navy during World War II. As with many of her class, the ship was never named. Instead, she was referred to by her hull designation.

Construction
LST-407 was laid down on 2 September 1942, under Maritime Commission (MARCOM) contract, MC hull 927, by the Bethlehem-Fairfield Shipyard, Baltimore, Maryland; launched 5 November 1942; then transferred to the United Kingdom and commissioned on 31 December 1942.

Service history 
LST-407 saw no active service in the United States Navy. LST-407 took part in the landings at Anzio in Italy on 22 January 1944. The tank landing ship was damaged beyond repair on 24 April 1944, and beached off Baiae, Italy. The hulk was accepted by the United States Navy on 6 May 1945. On 11 July 1945, LST-407 was struck from the Navy list. Sometime in July 1945, she was sold to a local Italian firm and scrapped.

See also 
 List of United States Navy LSTs

Notes 

Citations

Bibliography 

Books

Online resources

External links

 

Ships built in Baltimore
1942 ships
LST-1-class tank landing ships of the Royal Navy
World War II amphibious warfare vessels of the United Kingdom
S3-M2-K2 ships
Maritime incidents in April 1944